The 2023 Nigerian presidential election in Borno State will be held on 25 February 2023 as part of the nationwide 2023 Nigerian presidential election to elect the president and vice president of Nigeria. Other federal elections, including elections to the House of Representatives and the Senate, will also be held on the same date while state elections will be held two weeks afterward on 11 March.

Background
Borno State is a large, diverse northeastern state in the process of recovering from the worst of the Boko Haram insurgency. Still facing large-scale threats by and partial occupation from Boko Haram and ISWAP terrorists, the state also has to contend with an underdeveloped yet vital agricultural sector, desertification, and low education rates. Politically, the 2019 elections confirmed the state's status as one of the most staunchly APC states in the nation as both Buhari and APC gubernatorial nominee Babagana Umara Zulum won the state by wide margins and every single legislative seat on the senatorial, house of representatives, and house of assembly levels were carried by APC nominees.

Polling

Projections

General election

Results

By senatorial district 
The results of the election by senatorial district.

By federal constituency
The results of the election by federal constituency.

By local government area 
The results of the election by local government area.

See also 
 2023 Borno State elections
 2023 Nigerian presidential election

Notes

References 

Borno State gubernatorial election
2023 Borno State elections
Borno